Činkiai (formerly) was a village, located in Kėdainiai district municipality, in Kaunas County, in central Lithuania.

History 
At the end of the 19th century it belonged to the Medekšiai estate. Till 1863 it was a property of the Geištarai family.

On 27 October, 1971 Činkiai village of Pelėdnagiai selsovet was liquidated.

Demography

References

Kėdainiai District Municipality
Former populated places in Lithuania